Aretusa was a torpedo cruiser of the  built for the Italian Regia Marina (Royal Navy) in the 1880s. Laid down in June 1889 at the Cantiere navale fratelli Orlando shipyard, she was launched in March 1891 and was commissioned in September 1892. Her main armament were her six torpedo tubes, which were supported by a battery of ten small-caliber guns. Aretusa spent most of her career in the main Italian fleet, where she was primarily occupied with training exercises. At the start of the Italo-Turkish War in September 1911, she was assigned to the Red Sea Squadron in Italian Eritrea. She bombarded Ottoman positions in the Arabian Peninsula and took part in a blockade of the coast. Worn out by the end of the war in October 1912, Aretusa was sold for scrap that December and broken up.

Design

The Partenope-class cruisers were derivatives of the earlier, experimental s, themselves based on the preceding cruiser . The doctrine emphasized the use of small, torpedo-armed craft to destroy expensive ironclads.

She displaced  normally. The ship had a short forecastle deck that terminated at the conning tower. She had a crew of between 96 and 121 personnel.

Her propulsion system consisted of a pair of horizontal triple-expansion steam engines, each driving a single screw propeller. Steam was supplied by four coal-fired locomotive boilers, which were vented through two widely spaced funnels.

Aretusa was armed with a main battery of one  /40 gun placed on the forecastle. Close-range defense against torpedo boats was provided by a secondary battery of six  /43 guns mounted singly. She was also equipped with three  /20 guns in single mounts. Her primary offensive weapon was her five  torpedo tubes.

Service history

Aretusa was laid down at the Cantiere navale fratelli Orlando (Orlando Brothers' Shipyard) in Livorno on 1 June 1889, and was launched on 14 March 1891. After fitting-out work was completed, the ship was commissioned into the fleet on 1 September 1892. During the maneuvers, which lasted from 6 August to 5 September, the ships of the Reserve Squadron defended against a simulated attack by the Active Squadron, which gamed a French attack on the Italian fleet. Beginning on 14 October 1984, the Italian fleet, including Aretusa, assembled in Genoa for a naval review held in honor of King Umberto I at the commissioning of the new ironclad . The festivities lasted three days.

In 1895, Aretusa was stationed in the 2nd Maritime Department, split between Taranto and  Naples, along with most of the torpedo cruisers in the Italian fleet.

Italo-Turkish War

At the start of the Italo-Turkish War in September 1911, Aretusa was stationed in Italian Eritrea in the Red Sea Squadron. Italian naval forces in the region also included five protected cruisers and several smaller vessels. In a short engagement, the Italians vessels forced the Ottoman ship to flee into Al Hudaydah, bombarded the port facilities, and then withdrew. Peyk-i Şevket was later interned in British-controlled Suez.

The threat of an Ottoman attack from the Arabian Peninsula led the Italian High Command to reinforce the Red Sea Squadron; the additional ships included another cruiser and several destroyers. The protected cruiser  and two destroyers annihilated a force of seven Ottoman gunboats in the Battle of Kunfuda Bay on 7 January 1912. Following the neutralization of Ottoman naval forces in the region, Aretusa and the rest of the Italian ships then commenced a bombardment campaign against the Turkish ports in the Red Sea before declaring a blockade of the city of Al Hudaydah on 26 January.

On 27 July and 12 August, Aretusa, her sister ship Caprera, and Piemonte conducted two bombardments of Al Hudaydah. During the second attack, they destroyed an Ottoman ammunition dump. With the threat of an Ottoman attack greatly reduced, the High Command thereafter began to withdraw forces from the Red Sea Squadron. By the end of August, the unit was reduced to three protected cruisers, Aretusa, Caprera and two auxiliaries. On 14 October, the Ottoman government agreed to sign a peace treaty, ending the war. Aretusas career ended shortly thereafter; the Regia Marina discarded the ship in December and she was subsequently broken up for scrap.

Footnotes

Notes

Citations

References

External links
 Aretusa Marina Militare website

Partenope-class cruisers
Ships built in Livorno
1891 ships